May devotions to the Blessed Virgin Mary refer to special Marian devotions held in the Catholic Church during the month of May honoring Mary, mother of God, as "the Queen of May". These services may take place inside or outside. A "May Crowning" is a traditional Roman Catholic ritual that occurs in the month of May.

Origins
A number of traditions link the month of May to Mary. Alfonso in the thirteenth century wrote in his Cantigas de Santa Maria about the special honoring of Mary during specific dates in May. Eventually, the entire month was filled with special observances and devotions to Mary.

The origin of the conventional May devotion is still relatively unknown. Herbert Thurston identifies the seventeenth century as the earliest instance of the adoption of the custom of consecrating the month of May to the Blessed Virgin by special observances. It is certain that this form of Marian devotion began in Italy. Around 1739, witnesses speak of a particular form of Marian devotion in May in Grezzano near Verona. In 1747 the Archbishop of Genoa recommended the May devotion as a devotion for the home. Specific prayers for them were promulgated in Rome in 1838. 

According to Frederick Holweck, the May devotion in its present form originated at Rome where Father Latomia of the Roman College of the Society of Jesus, to counteract infidelity and immorality among the students, made a vow at the end of the eighteenth century to devote the month of May to Mary. From Rome, the practice spread to the other Jesuit colleges and thence to nearly every Catholic church of the Latin rite. In Rome by 1813, May devotions were held in as many as twenty churches. From Italy, May devotions soon spread to France. In Belgium, the May devotions, at least as a private devotion, were already known by 1803. The tradition of honoring Mary in a month-long May devotion spread eventually around the Roman Catholic world in the nineteenth century together with a month-long devotion to Jesus in June and the Rosary in October.

May devotions
In his 1965 encyclical, Mense Maio, Pope Paul VI identified the month of May as an opportune time to incorporate special prayers for peace into traditional May devotions.

There is no firm structure as to the content of a May devotion. It usually includes the singing of Marian anthems, readings from scriptures, and a sermon. Catholics offer Mary in May: pilgrimages, visits to churches dedicated to her, little sacrifices in her honor, periods of study and well-finished work offered up to her, and a more attentive recitation of the rosary. 

The last devotion on May 31 is often followed by a solemn procession, during which a statue or portrait of the Virgin Mary is carried back into the church. Some May devotions may take place outside or in a dedicated special place.

Family Devotions
One particular practice characteristic of May devotions is the May Altar, whether in a church or as a "house altar" in the home. Marian devotions such as the rosary may take place within the family around this altar consisting of a table with a Marian picture, candles, and decorated with many May flowers The custom of the May Altar stems from southern European countries. With the development of May Altars in churches, the custom spread to set up this type of "altar" also in the home.

This specific devotion has been supported by several popes including Pope Pius XII in his encyclical Ingruentium malorum:

  The custom of the family recitation of the Holy Rosary is a most efficacious means. What a sweet sight – most pleasing to God – when, at eventide, the Christian home resounds with the frequent repetition of praises in honor of the High  Queen of Heaven! Then the Rosary, recited in the family, assembled before the image of the Virgin, in an admirable union of hearts, the parents and their children, who come back from their daily work. It unites them piously with those absent and those dead. It links all more tightly in a sweet bond of love, with the most Holy Virgin, who, like a loving mother, in the circle of her children, will be there bestowing upon them an abundance of the gifts of concord and family peace.

May Devotions by 30 family groups

May devotions flourished across the world in the later part of nineteenth century. Eastern Churches had very clourful celebrations. Soon families gathered and had identified them for thirty days of the month, and the 31st day was celebrated by the entire village or town. Records show that in 1922 the Churches of Maravankudieruppu, the capital Church of Vaenaadu Catholics, and Kamanayakkanpatti, the Capital Church of Paandiyaa Kingdom Catholics have started the May Devotion by 30 family groups. The practice was followed by many churches in the country and in 1950s almost all the Churches in Indian Union started celebrating May Devotions by 30 family groups.

Mary, Queen of May 
Pope Pius XII, recognizing traditional precedents, proclaimed the "Queenship of Mary" through his encyclical, Ad Caeli Reginam.

While May devotions may differ in various countries, the Marian title "Queen of May" exists in several countries as manifested in Marian songs. In English speaking countries such as England, Ireland and the United States a Marian hymn uses the following text:  
 In German-speaking countries, the equivalent term is Maienkönigin ("May-Queen"): 

Another similar song greets Mary, the queen of May, who is greeted by the month of May.

Another well-known Marian "Queen of May" song ends with the words:
 O Mary we crown thee with blossoms today!
 Queen of the Angels and Queen of the May.
 O Mary we crown thee with blossoms today,
 Queen of the Angels and Queen of the May.

May crownings
In Eastern churches, crowning Mary was associated with adding ornamentation to an icon of Mary, sometimes as simple as adding additional gold trim. Perhaps in homage to this, Pope Clement VIII added two crowns to the icon of Salus Populi Romani in the Saint Mary Major Basilica in Rome. The crowns were eventually lost, but were replaced by Gregory XVI in 1837 in a rite that was to become the standard practice for crowning.

“Images are venerated ‘not because of a belief that these images themselves possess anything of divinity or power, but because the honor shown them is directed to the prototypes they represent’ (Council of Trent, session 25)” [BB, no. 1258].

Parishes and private groups often process and crown an image of the Blessed Virgin Mary with flowers. This often is referred to as a “May Crowning.” This rite may be done on solemnities and feasts of the Blessed Virgin Mary, or other festive days, and offers the Church a chance to reflect on Mary’s role in the history of salvation. In some countries, it takes place on or about May 1, however, in many United States Catholic parishes, it frequently takes place on Mother's Day.

The custom fell out of vogue in many places during the 1970s–80s, but has since made a comeback along with many other traditional Catholic practices. An image or likeness of the Blessed Virgin Mary is ceremonially crowned to signify her as Queen of Heaven and the Mother of God.

Today, May crownings occur in many Roman Catholic parishes and homes with the crowning of a statue of Mary. There is considerable flexibility regarding the rite, and it can be adapted to many different circumstances and situations depending on whether the crowning is done in a parish, a school or classroom, or even in the family. The rite may consist of hymns, prayers, and perhaps an act of consecration to Our Lady.

The climax of the celebration is the moment when the one of those present places a crown of flowers on Mary's head accompanied by a traditional hymn to the Blessed Mother. The ceremony usually takes place with young girls in dresses carrying flowers (traditionally hawthorn) to adorn the statue. One of the girls (often the youngest) carries a crown of flowers or an actual golden crown on a cushion for placement by the May Queen (often the oldest girl) on the statue. The flowers are replaced throughout the month to keep them fresh.

The Coronation of the Virgin became a popular subject in art.

Flores de Mayo

In the Philippines and other countries, Mary is fêted in May with the Flores de Mayo ("Flowers of May"), where devotees collect colourful flowers with which to decorate the parish church's altars and aisles (cf. chancel flowers). Catholic communities often congregate in the afternoons to pray the rosary, offer flowers to an image of the Virgin Mary, and share homemade delicacies and snacks. In more formal processions, children and adults wear their Sunday best, singing and dancing to welcome the rains that will water the new crops. 

The celebration is highlighted by the Santacruzan,  a ritual pageant celebrating the Finding of the Holy Cross. Young ladies, often called reynas ("queens"), are chosen to represent biblical figures such as Judith, Marian titles taken from the Litany of Loreto (e.g. Rosa Mística), and other traditional or allegorical figures from religious and national history (e.g. Reyna Emperatríz, Reyna Mora). The reynas, dressed in their finery and bearing attributes, walk through the town escorted by young men or boys. The Reyna Elena, representing Saint Helena, is the last and grandest; she bears a cross or crucifix as she is escorted by a young boy playing Constantine. All participants walk under mobile arches festooned with flowers or other decorations connoting bounty.

The Santacruzan custom in the Philippines is thus a fusion of both the May Marian devotions and celebrations surrounding Roodmas, which was once celebrated on 3 May.

In Lithuania

In 1853, May devotions arrived in Lithuania. It is thought that they were introduced in Samogitia by the initiative of bishop Motiejus Valančius. Later, at the end of the century the May devotions to the Blessed Virgin Mary began to be sung in Vilnius.

May devotions to the Blessed Virgin Mary are also called Mojava. They are sung not only in churches, but also in the homes of the faithful, – villagers and townspeople sing together after their day’s labours. For the occasion of the May devotions a small altar with a statue of Mary is prepared at home.

Mojava are also sung during the opening celebration of the Museum of Samogitian village.

Mary Gardens

Floral imagery from scripture and nature has been applied to Mary in the writings of the Church Fathers and in the liturgy, providing the foundation in tradition for the subsequent naming of hundreds of flowers for Mary's life, mysteries, virtues, excellences and divine prerogatives in the popular religious folk traditions of the medieval countrysides – as recorded by botanists, folklorists and lexicographers. The practice of honoring Mary with flowers originated among monasteries and convents in medieval Europe. During the Middle Ages, people saw reminders of Mary in the flowers and herbs growing around them. The first reference to an actual garden dedicated to Mary is from the life of St. Fiacre, Irish patron saint of gardening, who planted and tended a garden around the oratory to Our Lady he built at his famous hospice for the poor and infirm in France in the seventh century.

In the East floral gardens were introduced especially for the floral decorations for Mother Mary in May. Portuguese relations with Thamizh Naadu (now a part of Indian Union) started May Devotions in the seventeenth century and Catholic families started developing Floral Gardens in every home. European flowering plants were introduced in India during this time. Ezha Maarthandan Thirupappur, a Catholic crown prince of Ezhasa Naadu who was heading an Army in the name of Mother Mary has written that 'the celebrations of Mother Mary dominated that of our Lord Jesus, and hence June Devotion for our Lord had to be fiercely implemented'. He also has written that he had to curtail some of the programs associated with May Devotions in Ezhasa Naadu and his parent Kingdom Vaenaadu.

See also 

 Blessed Virgin Mary
 Consecration and entrustment to Mary
 Hymns to Mary
 Coronation of the Virgin
 Queen of Heaven
 Canonical coronations
 Oktav, double-octave in honour of our Lady of Luxembourg

References

External links
 May Crownings, "All About Mary", The Marian Library/International Marian Research Institute, University of Dayton. The University of Dayton's Marian Library/International Marian Research Institute (IMRI) is the world's largest repository of books, artwork and artifacts devoted to Mary, the mother of Christ, and a pontifical center of research and scholarship with a vast presence in cyberspace.
Religion & Ethics Newsweekly report on May Crowning at St. Mary of Czestochowa Church in Cicero, Illinois
May Crowning Hymns
Catholic group that does May Crownings

Catholic spirituality
Anglo-Catholicism
May observances
Marian feast days